Vietnam has competed at the IAAF World Athletics Championships on eleven occasions, and did not send a delegation for the 1987, 1997, 2001, 2005, and 2007 editions. Its competing country code is VIE. The country has not won any medals at the competition and as of 2017 no Vietnamese athlete has progressed beyond the first round of an event.

2019
Vietnam competed at the 2019 World Championships in Athletics in Doha, Qatar, from 27 September 2019.

References 

 
Vietnam
World Championships in Athletics